Dragoș Mihai Plopeanu (born 9 November 1988 in Bucharest) is a Romanian former footballer who is a goalkeeping coach

Club career

Dinamo București Youth
Dragos began his career at the age of 9 progressing through the ranks before leaving in 2004.

Inter Gaz București
After joining in the summer of 2004 Plopeanu was promoted to the 1st team where he went on to make 38 appearances.

Politehnica Timișoara
Plopeanu transferred to FC Politehnica Timișoara for a disclosed fee of €100,000. Primarily used in the reserve squad, Dragos went on to make 20 appearances for Politehnica II, before being sent on loan to Buftea.

Coaching career

ATK Mohun Bagan FC
Dragos was appointed as the coach of ATK Mohun Bagan in January 2022. He has the experience of coaching in Romania, along several other countries.

External links

1988 births
Living people
Romanian footballers
FC Politehnica Timișoara players
LPS HD Clinceni players
FC Gloria Buzău players
Association football goalkeepers
FC Dinamo București players
ASC Oțelul Galați players
Liga I players